Tyler Lepley (born March 24, 1987) is an American actor, best known for his portrayal of Benjamin "Benny" Young on the Tyler Perry produced prime time soap opera The Haves and the Have Nots; which is the first scripted television series to air on the Oprah Winfrey Network.

Early life and education
Lepley was born and raised in Philadelphia by his mother and stepfather, who has been in his life since the age of 6. Lepley is Italian on his mother's side and Jamaican on his biological father's side. Lepley revealed that he was teased as a child because he was the only biracial kid in his school. He graduated from Central Bucks High School West in Doylestown. Lepley did several sports including track, football, basketball, karate—as a young child—and boxing but focused more on football as he got older.

Lepley played football in high school under the name Tyler Dinnis. In June 2003, he suffered an injury which nearly ended his football career and later underwent surgery. By the summer of 2004, Lepley was back on the field and was selected as the MVP at sports camp for Villanova University. He attended Kutztown University on a football scholarship. Lepley played football for the university until the fall of 2007. Lepley went on to graduate from Kutztown in 2010 with a degree in criminal justice. Lepley accepted a friend's offer to relocate to Los Angeles in 2011 and found work as a personal trainer at Iron Fitness Gym in Santa Monica.

Career
About three months after he settled in Los Angeles, Lepley was discovered by a producer at a boxing gym who invited him to audition. From that meeting, he booked a lead role in an independent horror movie, Slumber Party Slaughter.  Lepley, reluctantly took his agent's advice to get serious about acting and enrolled in acting classes and he soon made his acting debut in an episode of The CW's 90210. In 2013, he booked the role of Benny on Tyler Perry's The Haves and the Have Nots after a long casting process. Lepley was quite surprised when Perry came to the audition dressed as his famous Madea character because he was shooting a movie at the time.  Lepley also appeared in the 2013 comedy Baggage Claim starring Paula Patton.

In early 2016, Lepley booked the lead role of Jaxon in the made-for-television film, produced by Swirl Films Ringside, directed by Russ Parr. The film premiered in September 2016 TV One. His costars included Everybody Hates Chris actor Tequan Richmond and R&B singer Sevyn Streeter. In 2019, Lepley was cast a series regular in the Starz drama, P-Valley. In 2020, he was cast in Harlem  Tracy Oliver Amazon comedy series.

Filmography

Film

Television

References

External links
 

1987 births
Male actors from Philadelphia
American male television actors
Living people
American people of Italian descent
American people of Jamaican descent
Kutztown University of Pennsylvania alumni